Governor Young may refer to:

Arthur Young (colonial administrator) (1854–1938), 17th Governor of the Straits Settlements from 1911 to 1920
Brigham Young (1801–1877), 1st Governor of Utah Territory from 1851 to 1858
C. C. Young (1869–1947), 26th Governor of California
Henry Young (1803–1870), Governor of South Australia from 1848 to 1855 and Governor of Tasmania from 1855 to 1861
Hubert Winthrop Young (1885–1950), Governor of Nyasaland from 1932 to 1934, Governor of Northern Rhodesia from 1935 to 1938, and Governor of Trinidad and Tobago from 1938 to 1942
Jeannette Young (born 1963), 27th Governor of Queensland from 2021 to present
John Young (governor) (1802–1852), 15th Governor of New York
John Young, 1st Baron Lisgar (1807–1876), 12th Governor of New South Wales from 1861 to 1867 and 2nd Governor General of Canada from 1869 to 1872
Mark Aitchison Young (1886–1974), 21st Governor of Hong Kong
Thomas L. Young (1832–1888), 33rd Governor of Ohio
W. A. G. Young (c. 1827–1885), Acting Governor of Jamaica in 1874 and 18th Governor of the Gold Coast from 1884 to 1885
William Douglas Young (1859–1943), Governor of the Falkland Islands from 1915 to 1920
Sir William Young, 2nd Baronet (1749–1815), Governor of Tobago from 1807 to 1815